Mohd Taufik bin Nordin also commercially known as Mohd Taufic Nordin. He is a Melaka born Malaysian composer and independent nasyid singer. He is considered to be among of the new top notch individuals developing the Malaysian nasyid independent music industry.

Education 
He holds a bachelor's degree in Material Science from the National University of Malaysia (UKM). He started his career as an engineer in CTRM Aero Composites Sdn Bhd and currently work as chief executive officer of Composites Testing Laboratory Asia Sdn Bhd(www.ctla.asia)

Career 
He has composed his first song when he was 13 years old and followed with the second pop song in the year after. His first nasyid song was composed when he was 17 years old and he has started involved in a nasyid group of Melaka High School between year 1995–1996. The highest achievement was as runner up in a district level nasyid school competition in Melaka.

In the same year he has composed another 5 pop songs to be included in his demo album with other 3 best friends and form a group called R3F. The demo was sent to EMI. EMI responded but not interested to offer any record deal. In the same year R3F produced another demo album with more songs originally written by mohd Taufik bin Nordin but the group decided to keep the album instead of sending it to any record label as most of the members start continue their study in higher level including Mohd Taufik bin Nordin.

In his one-year session of matriculation (pre-university), Mohd Taufik has composed his first theme song for the matriculation annual dinner titled "NUMMAC 97".
In 1998, he continued his study in National University of Malaysia(UKM), Bangi Selangor whereby he became the founder of Firasat Inzar Nasyid Club of UKM (the official university nasyid club) and the club is still establish until today. He also compose the theme song for "Anak Melaka UKM Club" with title "Segalanya Bermula Di Sini".

During his study in UKM, he was actively involved in nasyid competition, song competition, nasyid concert, koir performance, lyric and songwriting. His 1st generation of Firasat Inzar was invited as guest performer in a huge concert of popular Malaysian nasyid group; Hijjaz and Saujana in UKM. They debut two new single of Firasat Inzar during the concert and received an overwhelming responses from fans.

Soon after the graduation, he became the testing engineer in CTRM Aero Composites Sdn Bhd in Melaka and continue with his interest in music as song composer, vocal coach and lyricist. As for today he is the Head of Division of Operation and Technical in CTL Asia Sdn Bhd and managing director of his company named mtnrmusic .

Singers: Halwa Nurani, Firasat Inzar, Nawarastu, Zabarjad, Daluwarsa, Irhamnie, Nurqhasra, DGWA, Bilal Al Rayess, Imtiaz, Qurratuaini, Cahaya Gemilang, Azzahran, Humaira, Hamrah, Nurani, Zulfan, Caliph@Navy, Ali Imran, A'ish, Insyirah, Invoices and Ajude.

Commercial 
His first commercial debut nasyid song title "Rindu Kedamaian" a nasyid song recorded by Devotees  in the album titled "Berjalan Tanpa Henti" and released in 2011 . His international debut was recorded by a Middle Eastern reality TV star (winner of Studio El Fan 1996–1997); Bilal Al Rayess from Lebanon and the single with title "Aali Sawoutik" lyric by Tony Abi Karam. This single is released exclusively by MTV Lebanon on 18 March 2012.

Achievements

1996
 2nd District School Nasyid Competition
  "Hindarilah Dadah" – Song/Lyric by Mohd Taufik Bin Nordin
1998
 Champion of UKM Nasyid Competition
  "Hindarilah Dadah" – Firasat Inzar Song/Lyric by Mohd Taufik Bin Nordin
 1st Runner MAKUM Nasyid Competition
  "Langkah Kemenangan" – Firasat Inzar Song/Lyric by Mohd Taufik Bin Nordin
1999
 1st Runner MAKUM Nasyid Competition
  "Siratan Tabir Ilmi" – Firasat Inzar Song by Mohd Taufik Bin Nordin/Lyric by Mohd Affendy Izani
  Best Lyric Award
  " Muara Kelayuan" – Firasat Inzar Song/Lyric by Mohd Taufik Bin Nordin
1999
 1st Runner MAKUM Nasyid Competition
  "Siratan Tabir Ilmi" – Firasat Inzar Song by Mohd Taufik Bin Nordin/Lyric by Mohd Affendy Izani
  Best Lyric Award
  " Muara Kelayuan" – Firasat Inzar Song/Lyric by Mohd Taufik Bin Nordin
2000
 Champion UKM Pop Song Competition
  "Melankolia" – Mohd Taufik Bin Nordin Song by Mohd Taufik Bin Nordin/Lyric Mohd Afendy Izani
  Best Song Award
2001
 State Champion Selangor Nasyid Festival – Nasyid Modern Category
  "Kudus Kesiangan"* – Firasat Inzar Song by Mohd Taufik Bin Nordin/Lyric by Mohd Azli bin Othman
  *this song represent Selangor in the National Nasyid Competition of 2001
2006
 State Champion Melaka Nasyid Festival – Nasyid Traditional Category 
  "Siratan Tabir Ilmu"* – Halwa Nurani Song by Mohd Taufik Bin Nordin/Lyric by Mohd Afendy Izani
  *this song represent Melaka in the National Nasyid Competition of 2006
 State Champion Negeri Sembilan Nasyid Festival – Nasyid Modern Category
  "Gapai Impi"* – Nawarastu Song by Mohd Taufik Bin Nordin/Lyric by Che Rosnah Daud
  *this song represent Negeri Sembilan in the National Nasyid Competition of 2006
 Champion Open Category Nasyid Festival – Nasyid Modern Category
  "Dan Hatinya"* – Nur Qhasrah Song by Mohd Taufik Bin Nordin/Lyric by Mohd Azli Othman
  *this song represent Open Category in the National Nasyid Competition of 2006
 1st Runner-up National Nasyid Festival- Nasyid Modern Category
  "Gapai Impi"* – Nawarastu Song by Mohd Taufik Bin Nordin/Lyric by Che Rosnah Daud
  Best Modern Song
  Best Modern Lyric
2007
 State Champion Melaka Nasyid Festival – Nasyid Traditional Category
  "Kemilau Insan"* – Daluwarsa Song by Mohd Taufik Bin Nordin/Lyric by Raja Mohd Azlan
  *this song represent Melaka in the National Nasyid Competition of 2007
 State Champion Negeri Sembilan Nasyid Festival – Nasyid Modern Category 
  "Dian Gemilang"* – Nawarastu Song by Mohd Taufik Bin Nordin/Lyric by Che Rosnah Daud
  *this song represent Negeri Sembilan in the National Nasyid Competition of 2007
2008
 State Champion Negeri Sembilan Nasyid Festival – Nasyid Traditional Category
  "Lintasan Nurani"* – Zabarjad Song/Lyric by Mohd Taufik Bin Nordin
  *this song represent Negeri Sembilan in the National Nasyid Competition of 2008
2009
 State Champion Melaka Nasyid Festival – Nasyid Traditional Category
  "Langkah Sekata"* – Irhamnie** Song by Jasnie/Lyric by Kamaruddin
  Best Performance
  Overall Winner
  *this song represent Melaka in the National Nasyid Competition of 2009
  **Mohd Taufik is one of the vocalist in this group
 State Champion Negeri Sembilan Nasyid Festival – Nasyid Traditional Category 
  "Tulus Mahabbah"* – Nawarastu Song by Mohd Taufik Bin Nordin/Lyric by Mohammad Mohd Tawil
  *this song represent Negeri Sembilan in the National Nasyid Competition of 2009
 State Champion Negeri Sembilan Nasyid Festival – Nasyid Modern Category
  "Kebangkitan"* – Imtiaz Song by Mohd Taufik Bin Nordin/Lyric by Mohammad Mohd Tawil
  *this song represent Negeri Sembilan in the National Nasyid Competition of 2009
 State Champion Selangor Nasyid Festival – Nasyid Modern Category
  "Harum Islami"* – Firasat Inzar Song by Mohd Taufik Bin Nordin/Lyric by Muhammad Mohd Tawil
  *this song represent Selangor in the National Nasyid Competition of 2009
 Champion Government Nasyid Festival – Nasyid Modern Category
  "Satu Iltizam"* – DG-WA Song by Mohd Taufik Bin Nordin/Lyric by Mohammad Mohd Tawil
  *this song represent Government in the National Nasyid Competition of 2009
 National Nasyid Competition – Nasyid Traditional Category
  "Langkah Sekata"* – Irhamnie** Song by Jasnie/Lyric by Kamaruddin
  Top 5 – Finalist Traditional Nasyid Category
2010
 State Champion Wilayah Persekutuan Nasyid Festival – Nasyid Traditional Category
  "Indah Pekerti"* – Insyirah Song by Mohd Taufik Bin Nordin/Lyric by Mohd Azli Othman
  *this song represent Wilayah Persekutuan in the National Nasyid Competition of 2010
 State Champion Wilayah Persekutuan Nasyid Festival – Nasyid Modern Category
  "Kurnia Dari Hakiki"* – Cahaya Gemilang Song/Lyric by Mohd Taufik Bin Nordin/Lyric by Andy
  Mirza/Mohd Taufik Bin Nordin
  *this song represent Wilayah Persekutuan in the National Nasyid Competition of 2010
 State Champion Melaka Nasyid Festival – Nasyid Traditional Category
  "Berjalan Sehaluan"* – Irhamnie Song by Mohd Taufik Bin Nordin/Lyric by Mohammad Mohd Tawil
  Best Performance
  Overall Winner
  *this song represent Melaka in the National Nasyid Competition of 2010
  Finalist in National Nasyid Competition of 2010 (top 5)
 State Champion Melaka Nasyid Festival – Nasyid Modern Category
  "Pengharapan"* – Irhamnie Song by Mohd Taufik Bin Nordin/Lyric by Mohammad Mohd Tawil
  *this song represent Melaka in the National Nasyid Competition of 2010
 State Champion Negeri Sembilan Nasyid Festival – Nasyid Modern Category
  "Genta Wahdah"* – Nawarastu Song by Mohd Taufik Bin Nordin/Lyric by Mohammad Mohd Tawil
  *this song represent Negeri Sembilan in the National Nasyid Competition of 2010
2011
 State Champion Melaka Nasyid Festival – Nasyid Traditional 
  "Kelana"* – Irhamnie Song by Mohd Taufik Bin Nordin/Lyric by Mohammad Mohd Tawil
  Best Performance
  Overall Winner
  *this song represent Melaka in the National Nasyid Competition of 2011
 Champion MAKUM Nasyid Festival – Nasyid Modern Category
  "Kiblat Ku"* – Firasat Inzar Song/Lyric by Mohd Taufik Bin Nordin
  *this song represent MAKUM in the National Nasyid Competition of 2011
 State Champion Wilayah Persekutuan Nasyid Festival – Nasyid Traditional Category
  "Kalamullah"* – A'ish Song by Mohd Taufik Bin Nordin/Lyric by Ustaz As'ari Abdan
  *this song represent Wilayah Persekutuan in the National Nasyid Competition of 2011
 State Champion Wilayah Persekutuan Nasyid Festival – Nasyid Modern Category
  "Khalifah"* – Zulfan Song by Rohaizad/Lyric by Mohd Taufik Bin Nordin
  *this song represent Johor in the National Nasyid Competition of 2011
 State Champion Negeri Sembilan Nasyid Festival – Nasyid Traditional Category 
  "Hijrah"* – Ali Imran Song by Mohd Taufik Nordin/Lyric by Syanil Tsaure
  *this song represent Negeri Sembilan in the National Nasyid Competition of 2011
2012
 Youth National Nasyid Festival 2012
  "Khalifah" – Caliph@Navy Song by Rohaizad/Lyric by Mohd Taufik Nordin
  Champion
 Selangor Nasyid Festival – Nasyid Traditional Category 
  "Hijrah"* – Ali Imran Song by Mohd Taufik Nordin/Lyric by Syanil Tsaure
  1st Runner-up 
 Pertandingan Nasyid & Marhaban Anjuran JKKN 
  "Berjalan Sehaluan"* – Nurqhasra Song by Mohd Taufik Bin Nordin/Lyric by Mohammad Mohd Tawil
  1st Runner-up 
 National Level Pertandingan Nasyid Belia 4B National Level 
  "Al Quran Kalamullah"* – Nawarastu Song by Mohd Taufik Bin Nordin/Lyric by Ustaz As'ari Abdan
  "Nur Keinsafan"* – Nawarastu Song by Mohd Taufik Bin Nordin/Lyric by Che Rosnah Daud
  1st Runner-up 
 Pertandingan Cipta Nasyid Anjuran JKKN & Radio IKIM FM 
  "Satu Iltizam"* – DGWA Feat Azwan Fareast Song by Che Rosnah Daud & Mohd Taufik Bin Nordin/Lyric by Mohammad Mohd Tawil
  Finalist Top 15
 Johor Nasyid Festival – Nasyid Modern Category 
  "Semalam"* – Hamrah Song by Mohd Taufik Nordin/Lyric by Che Rosnah Daud
  1st Runner-up 
 State Champion Melaka Nasyid Festival – Nasyid Traditional Category
  "Ukhuwah"* – Irhamnie Song by Mohd Taufik Nordin/Lyric by Mohd Taufik Nordin
  Champion
 State Champion Kuala Lumpur Nasyid Festival – Nasyid Modern Category 
 "Meraih Cinta Hakiki"* – Humaira Song by Mohd Taufik Nordin/Lyric by Che Rosnah 
  Champion
 Kuala Lumpur Nasyid Festival – Nasyid Modern Category
 "KasihNya"* – Invoices Song by Mohd Taufik Nordin/Lyric by Muhammad Mohd Tawil
 3rd Runner-up
 Kuala Lumpur Nasyid Festival – Nasyid Traditional Category
 "Hikmah Pelayaran"* – Nurani Song by Mohd Taufik Nordin/Lyric by Muhammad Mohd Tawil
 3rd Runner-up
2013
 Negeri Sembilan Nasyid Festival 2013 - Nasyid Traditional Category
  "Dan HatiNya" – Nawarastu Song by MOhd Taufik Nordin/Lyric by Mohd Taufik Nordin
  Champion
  Best Traditional Lyric
2014
 Youth Nasyid Festival 2014 State Level - Melaka
  "Cinta Ilahi" – Irhamnie Song by Mohd Taufik Nordin/Lyric by Mohd Taufik Nordin
  Champion
 Youth Nasyid Festival 2014 State Level - Negeri Sembilan
  "Gapai Impi" – Nawarastu Song by Mohd Taufik Nordin/Lyric by Che Rosnah Daud
  Champion
 Youth Nasyid Festival 2014 State Level - Selangor
  "Siratan Tabir Ilmi" – Song by Mohd Taufik Nordin/Lyric by Mohd taufik Nordin
  Champion
 Youth National Nasyid Festival – 4th 
  "Cinta Ilahi"* – Irhamnie Song by Mohd Taufik Nordin/Lyric by Syanil Tsaure

References

 Gapai Impi johan lagu nasyid kategori moden Festival Nasyid Peringkat Kebangsaan ke-17
 Nawarastu Unggulli Festival Nasyid Negeri Sembilan Dalam Kategori Moden
Nawarastu Johan Nasyid Tradisi
 Kumpulan DG-WA johan Festival Nasyid Kementerian 2009
Nasyid mampu saingi  hiburan muzik Barat
Irhamnie Johan Keseluruhan Festival Nasyid Peringkat Negeri Melaka
 Kumpulan Nasyid Irhamnie Dinobat Juara Keseluruhan 
 Ali Imran Johan Nasyid Kategori Tradisi 
Devotees Enggan Di Manipulasi Lagi
Majlis Pelancaran Album Devotees Berjalan Tanpa Henti
Devotees Akan Terus Berjalan Tanpa Henti
Devotees Tak Langgar Syariah
Night of pride and celebration for Batu Pahat

External links
 Mtnrmusic official website

1979 births
Living people
Malaysian male singer-songwriters
Malaysian singer-songwriters
National University of Malaysia alumni
Malaysian world music singers